Laws Hall may refer to:

Laws Hall (Miami University), library
Laws Hall (University of Missouri), residence hall

See also
Lawshall, village in Suffolk, England